Brian Kokoska (born November 8, 1988 in Vancouver, British Columbia) is a New York-based artist known for his paintings, sculptures and installations.

Education
Kokoska received his BFA from Vancouver's Emily Carr University of Art and Design in 2010.

Work

Brian is recognized for his paintings of faces, flowers, masks, text and other scenery. He also makes monochromatic sculptural installations that incorporate heads, pedestals and acquired objects. New York art writer Christopher Eamon described Kokoska's work as the exception to "the abject in American art [having] had its apotheosis in the early 1990s in the work of Mike Kelley and Cindy Sherman."

Exhibitions
Selected solo and group exhibitions include American Medium (New York), Preteen Gallery (Mexico City), Arcadia Missa (London), and The Still House Group (Brooklyn).

External links
 Brian Kokoska's website

References 

1988 births
20th-century Canadian painters
Canadian male painters
21st-century Canadian painters
American contemporary artists
Artists from New York City
Artists from Vancouver
Canadian digital artists
Contemporary sculptors
Emily Carr University of Art and Design alumni
Living people
20th-century sculptors
20th-century Canadian male artists
21st-century Canadian male artists